Covert Glacier is a glacier flowing from the northeast part of the Royal Society Range between Pearsall Ridge and Stoner Peak, joining the Blue Glacier drainage in the vicinity of Granite Knolls, Victoria Land. It was named in 1992 by the Advisory Committee on Antarctic Names after Kathy L. Covert, a cartographer with the United States Geological Survey. She led the two-person (satellite surveying, seismology) team at South Pole Station, winter party 1982, and was a senior member of the geodetic control party at Minna Bluff, Mount Discovery, White Island, and Beaufort Island, 1986–87 season.

References
 

Glaciers of Scott Coast